Lesbian, gay, bisexual, and transgender (LGBT) persons in Kyrgyzstan face legal challenges not experienced by non-LGBT residents. Both male and female same-sex sexual activity are legal in Kyrgyzstan, but same-sex couples and households headed by same-sex couples are ineligible for the same legal protections available to opposite-sex married couples.

Since the Dissolution of the Soviet Union, Kyrgyzstan has come increasingly under the influence of Islam and socially conservative attitudes tend to dominate within the society. Reports of discrimination and violence against LGBT people are frequent.

Law regarding same-sex sexual activity
Consensual sexual acts between persons of the same sex have been legal in Kyrgyzstan since 1998. The heterosexual and homosexual age of consent is 16.

Recognition of same-sex relationships
Kyrgyzstan does not recognise same-sex marriage or civil unions.

Since 2016, the Kyrgyz Constitution has explicitly banned same-sex marriage.

Gender identity and expression
Transgender people are allowed to redefine their gender legally in Kyrgyzstan, but require undergoing sex reassignment surgery. The first such surgery was performed in Bishkek in January 2014.

Living conditions
Most people in Kyrgyzstan have prejudices against homosexuality, usually rooted in social conservatism and lingering preconceptions dating from the Soviet period. As a result, LGBT people fear being socially outcast by their friends and families, causing them to keep their sexual orientation or gender identity secret, especially in rural areas.

Before the 2010s, ignorance about LGBT rights resulted in a somewhat "liberal" scene and safe haven for LGBT people, especially in the capital Bishkek. In 2014, however, the Government launched a series of legal reforms including an "anti-gay propaganda law". This has led to the LGBT community being thrust into the spotlight, and a near 300% increase in attacks against LGBT people.

Bishkek's only gay bar, London, had to shut down in 2017.

According to 2018 reports, police officials have been blackmailing LGBT people on social media and dating sites, requesting between 5000 and 30,000 soms (70 to 500 U.S. dollars).

Activism
There are multiple LGBT groups in Kyrgyzstan, including Kyrgyz Indigo and Labrys (Лабрис), founded in 2004. Labrys staff also conduct training for doctors and psychiatrists on sexual orientation and gender identity.

In recent years, more and more politicians have resorted to use openly homophobic rhetoric. On 8 March 2019, a peaceful march of about 400 people occurred in the capital Bishkek. Although the march was meant to commemorate the International Women's Day, it saw a heavy bent towards LGBT issues, which the media then dubbed Kyrgyzstan's "first gay pride march". The event, however, drew notable controversy, especially from members of parliament who expressed murderous threats to the participants. MP Jyldyz Musabekova wrote on Facebook that "the men who do not want to have children and the girls who do not want to pour tea...must not only be cursed, they must be beaten". She was quickly condemned by other deputies.

Human rights groups and the organisers defended the march and the presence of LGBT rainbow flags. Bektour Iskender, founder of the popular Kloop news website and a participant in the march, said, "I think it's very cool that the LGBT community came on the march, because this is also related to the rights of women if we are talking about lesbians and transgender girls who face tremendous violence in Kyrgyzstan". LGBT activists described the event as "a turning point".

Freedom of expression

In 2014, a bill was introduced to the Parliament to criminalise expression which creates "a positive attitude toward non-traditional sexual relations, using the media or information and telecommunications networks." On 15 October, the bill passed its first reading, in a 79-7 vote. It has received wide international opposition, and has been delayed multiple times. A final vote on the bill was expected to take place in 2016, but was postponed and ultimately failed to pass.

Summary table

See also

Dastan Kasmamytov
Human rights in Kyrgyzstan
LGBT rights in Asia

References